Edgar Vincent Frederick McCrillis (September 7, 1904 – September 1, 1940) was a professional football player who spent two seasons in the National Football League with the Providence Steam Roller, in 1926, and the Boston Bulldogs in 1929. Prior to playing professional football, Ed played college football at Brown University. He was later selected for Brown's All-Decade Team (1920–1929).

Referees

1904 births
1940 deaths
American football guards
Boston Bulldogs (NFL) players
Brown Bears football players
Providence Steam Roller players
Players of American football from New York City